Mats Hallberg (born 12 December 1964) is a retired Swedish professional golfer.

Hallberg turned professional in 1984 and played on the Swedish Tour before joining the European Tour in 1988. On the tour he had eight top-10 finishes, including third at the 1996 Scottish Open and the 1997 Volvo Scandinavian Masters, earning a total of €617,028. His biggest success in a major came at the 1995 Open Championship where he shot a first round of 68 (−4), one stroke off the lead. John Daly eventually won at −6 after a playoff, and Hallberg finished tied for 68th along with Tiger Woods.

Hallberg was in contention at the 1998 Volvo PGA Championship, the European tour's flagship event, held at Wentworth Club. Finding himself one stroke behind the leader, compatriot Michael Jonzon, after two rounds and one stroke behind leader Colin Montgomerie after three rounds, he finished with a round of 70 versus the Scotsman's 69 to end the tournament two strokes behind the triumphing Montgomerie. The finish helped Hallberg reach a peak of 174 on the Official World Golf Ranking in 1998.

Hallberg played intermittently on the Challenge Tour, winning three tournaments 1990–91. On the 1994 Challenge Tour he was runner up the Rolex Pro-Am, Ramlösa Open, Jämtland Open, and lost a playoff at Himmerland Open.

After cutting back on his playing schedule, Hallberg became a broadcaster. In 2016 he joined C More Entertainment's European Tour coverage.

Professional wins (4)

Challenge Tour wins (3)

Challenge Tour playoff record (0–1)

Other wins (1)
2009 Eskilstuna Open

References

External links

Swedish male golfers
European Tour golfers
Sportspeople from Södermanland County
People from Nyköping Municipality
1964 births
Living people